FC Tranzit was a Latvian football club that is based in Ventspils. Prior to 2010 it was known as FC Tranzīts.

Players

First-team squad
As of April 27, 2010

For recent transfers see: List of Latvian football transfers summer 2010.

References

External links
 Latvijas Futbola federācija

Sport in Ventspils
Football clubs in Latvia
Association football clubs established in 2006
2006 establishments in Latvia